The Gatwick School is an all-through free school located on the Manor Royal estate, on the northern outskirts of Crawley, just south of the Gatwick Airport boundary.

Development
The development of the school has at times been fraught and controversial. The school's planning application was rejected in July 2015 due to traffic and safety concerns. The school initially opened in industrial units on the Manor Royal Business Park in 2014, and applied for development permission on the site. In addition to opposition in relation to parking, noise and traffic, the application was also opposed by the Manor Royal business group which opposed any non-business development within the Manor Royal.

References

External links 
 The Gatwick School official site

Secondary schools in West Sussex
Educational institutions established in 2014
2014 establishments in England
Primary schools in West Sussex